The 2013 Women's European Volleyball League was the fifth edition of the annual Women's European Volleyball League, which featured women's national volleyball teams from eight European countries. A preliminary league round was played from June 13 to July 6, and the final four tournament, which was held in Bulgaria on July 11–12, 2013.

For this years edition, the first four sets were played over 21 points.

Germany defeated Belgium 3–2 in the final.

Teams

League round

Pool A

|}

Leg 1
The tournament was played at Cengiz Göllü Volleyball Hall, Bursa, Turkey.

|}

Leg 2
The tournament was played at Messzi István Sportcsarnok, Kecskemét, Hungary.

|}

Leg 3
The tournament was played in Sala Polivalentă Oltenia, Craiova, Romania.

|}

Leg 4
The tournament was played in Palace of Culture and Sports, Varna, Bulgaria.

|}

Pool B

|}

Leg 1
The tournament was played at Sport Oase, Leuven, Belgium.

|}

Leg 2
The tournament was played at Hala Sportova "Dudova Suma", Subotica, Serbia.

|}

Leg 3
The tournament was played in CU Arena, Hamburg, Germany.

|}

Leg 4
The tournament was played in Metrowest Sport Palace, Ra'anana, Israel.

|}

Final four
The final four was held in at the Palace of Culture and Sports in Varna, Bulgaria from July 13 to 14, 2013.

Qualified teams

 (host)

Bracket

Semifinals

|}

Third place game

|}

Final

|}

Final standing

Awards
MVP:  Charlotte Leys
Best Scorer:  Margareta Kozuch
Best Spiker:  Margareta Kozuch
Best Blocker:  Freya Aelbrecht
Best Server:  Denise Hanke
Best Setter:  Frauke Dirickx
Best Receiver:  Mariya Karakasheva
Best Libero:  Valérie Courtois

References

External links
Official website

2013 Women
European Volleyball League
International volleyball competitions hosted by Bulgaria
2013 in Bulgarian women's sport